Syed Zaid Zaman Hamid, better known as Zaid Hamid, is a Pakistani far-right, radical Islamist political commentator and conspiracy theorist.

The Muslim 500 included him in their yearly most influential Muslims in the world, as a political commentator and host of TV series on geo-politics, Islamic philosophy, Muslim history, and Dr. Iqbal’s vision for Pakistan.

Born to a Pakistan Army officer and a Kashmiri mother, Zaid is a supporter of Jihad and supports Kashmir-centric anti-government organizations. He claims he fought in Soviet-Afghan War. He is a supporter of Pakistan Army interventions in matters of state and actively campaigns against Democracy in Pakistan. He supports Islamic system of government.

Early life and education
Zaid was born on March 14, 1964, in Karachi, Sindh, Pakistan to a Bihari Muhajir Muslim father and a Kashmiri Muslim mother. His father was a Pakistan Army officer. He studied computer systems at the NED University of Engineering & Technology in Karachi. He is second of his four siblings. His father fought in the Indo-Pakistani War of 1965 and 1971.

Political views
Hamid claims that the November 2008 Islamist-Terrorist Attacks in Mumbai, Maharashtra, India were part of a plan hatched by "Hindu Zionists", and that it was an attempt by the Indians to stage a false flag attack, which he accuses the 9/11 attacks of being.

On May 27, 2011, he claimed on News One TV channel that Ajmal Qasab's real name was Amar Singh. He was a Sikh and a RAW agent. He also called him a BJP terrorist. His associate's name was Heera Laal.

In May 2020, Zaid Hamid said that the COVID vaccine will rid the Muslims of Islamic spirit. COVID is less dangerous than flu. Bill Gates wants to kill the people of this region.

On August 6, 2021, he tweeted: "I strongly believe that Pakistan must abandon the UN resolutions (on Kashmir) now...They are dead."

Hamid believes that Islamic-prophet Muhammad had declared war on India, and claims that India will be "trounced and enslaved according to Sharia if Hindus don’t repent and embrace Islam."

Criticism
A number of Pakistani journalists, writers and Islamic scholars have criticized Hamid and have described his views on politics and security as conspiracy theories. Zaid Hamid has been criticized as xenophobic and accused of  hate speech towards Hindus, Jews, Christians and Pashtuns.

In 2013, Imaad Khalid, a former staff member of Zaid Hamid, revealed at a press conference, that Zaid Hamid was plotting to assassinate Pro-democracy Army Chief, Ashfaq Pervaiz Kayani. He showed Media the emails that he claims were sent by Zaid Hamid to different Army Officers asking them for a revolt against their own chief. He said "Zaid Hamid is a quisling and enemy of Islam and Pakistan, who had plotted unsuccessfully to assassinate the pro-democracy army chief Gen Kayani."  Khalid further claimed that Zaid's hit list also contained the names of Chief Justice Iftikhar Muhammad Chaudhry, Prime Minister Nawaz Sharif, and others from the media and the judiciary.

Historian Manan Ahmed Asif called him the leading voice of a new Pakistani revivalism, because he radicalizes young, urban men and women under the age of 30 - the largest demographics of Pakistan - into a mixture of militant Pakistani nationalism and Islamism. Ali Usman Qasmi notes him to have an "extreme hatred of Hindus and Jews."

Arrest in Saudi Arabia
In June 2015, Hamid was arrested in Saudi Arabia for opposing Saudi-led intervention in Yemen. He was visiting the Kingdom on a private tour with family when he was arrested.

On July 1, 2015, media sources began citing unconfirmed reports that Hamid has been sentenced to 8 years in prison, and 1,000 or 1,200 lashes, for criticizing the Saudi government. Media reports later claimed these reports about the sentence could not be verified. The Pakistan embassy has officially requested consular access and information about the charges against Hamid. He was released in the start of October 2015 due to lack of evidence and baseless allegation of spying for Iran. Hamid alleges that the allegation of spying was hatched up by the Research and Analysis Wing (R&AW), India's spy agency.

During an interview in 2020, Mr. Hamid claimed that then Pakistan Army chief General Raheel Sharif and DG ISI Lt. General Rizwan Akhtar had played an instrumental role in securing his release.

Books
His books include:

Urdu
Pākistān : ek ʻishq, ek junūn. Booklet describing account of freedom struggle for Pakistan.
Islām kā siyāsī taṣavvur : Pākistān men̲ maz̲habī o firqahvārānah tashaddud. Booklet on political thoughts in Islam, includes a brief history of sectarian violence in Pakistan from 1979 to 1996.
Dahshat gardī ke k̲h̲ilāf Amrīkī jang. Critical study of war on terror.
Hindū ṣaihūnīyat. Critical study of Pak-India relations from ancient times to 21st century.
Yahūdī aur ʻĪsāʼī Ṣaihūnīyat. Booklet on alleged Jewish and Christian conspiracies against Muslims.
Maujūdah Pāk Afghān taʻalluqāt, ek tārīk̲h̲ almīyah. Historical study of Pakistan and Afghanistan relations; critical review.
Iqbal Purisrar. On the life and thought of Muhammad Iqbal.
Halqa-E-Yaran. A novel concerning matters of spirituality, in the spirit of Ashfaq Ahmed.
Khilafat-e-Rashida. On the Rashidun caliphs, their system of governance and justice.

English
Mumbai : dance of the devil : Hindu Zionists, Mumbai attacks, and the Indian dossier against Pakistan
From Indus to Oxus : memoirs. Memoirs of author highlighting his role in Soviet-Afghan war, 1979–1989; includes his visits and meeting with Afghan leaders in Afghanistan during 1986–1992. Later translated into Urdu by himself as Daryā e Sindh sai daryā e Āmūtak : yād'dāshtīn̲.

References

External links
 Official website

Pakistani Islamists
Pakistani Muslim activists
9/11 conspiracy theorists
Living people
1964 births
People from Karachi
NED University of Engineering & Technology alumni
Pakistani conspiracy theorists
Pakistani people of Bihari descent
Pakistani people of Kashmiri descent
Critics of Judaism
Anti-Western sentiment
Prisoners and detainees of Saudi Arabia
Pakistani Muslim scholars of Islam
Iqbal scholars
Pakistani nationalists
Pakistani columnists
Pakistani novelists
People of the Soviet–Afghan War
Defence and security analysts in Pakistan